Oh, Boy! is a 1919, American silent comedy film directed by Albert Capellani and starring June Caprice, Creighton Hale, and Zena Keefe. It was based on the stage musical of the same name written by Guy Bolton and P. G. Wodehouse.

Cast
 June Caprice as Lou Ellen Carter 
 Creighton Hale as George Budd 
 Zena Keefe as Jackie Sampson 
 Flora Finch as Miss Penelope Budd 
 William H. Thompson as Judge Daniel Carter 
 Grace Reals as Mrs. Carter 
 Joseph Conyers as Constable Simms 
 J.K. Murray as Dean of Richguys College 
 Maurice 'Lefty' Flynn as Lefty Flynn 
 Albert Capellani as Orchestra leader 
 Ben Taggart as Charles Hartley

References

Bibliography
 Brian Taves. P.G. Wodehouse and Hollywood: Screenwriting, Satires and Adaptations. McFarland, 2006.

External links

1919 films
1919 comedy films
Silent American comedy films
Films directed by Albert Capellani
American silent feature films
1910s English-language films
American black-and-white films
Pathé Exchange films
1910s American films